Irma Sokhadze, (ირმა სოხაძე, stylized Irma Soxadze), (born 28 November 1955) is a Georgian singer and pianist. 

She performed and toured as an eight-year-old, becoming a child star with "An Orange Song" which was specially written for her. In addition to pop songs, she has specialized in both jazz and classical music and has composed songs to her own lyrics. For 25 years, Sokhadze hosted Georgian television programmes on music, including TV marathons to provide financial support for needy children and their families. In 2014, she appeared in her own special concert in Tbilisi, celebrating a career spanning 50 years.

Biography
Born in 1955, Irma Sokhadze was the daughter of a well-to-do family. Her father, a scientist, and her mother, a linguist, introduced her to music when she was just two years old, when she sang at home with her parents and brother. When she was five, she made her first appearance on television, singing one song in Italian and another in Georgian. She became a soloist with the Georgian State Orchestra and went on tour to several countries. In 1966, she performed at the Olympia in Paris.

As a gifted child, she attended Tbilisi's Central School of Music, matriculating with honours in 1974. She also studied piano and musicology at the Conservatory, graduating with honours in 1979.

From 1980 to 2004, Sokhadze made frequent broadcasts on Georgian television, where she also worked as an editor and author. In particular, in the 1990s she presented a series of marathons as a means of providing support to children who had suffered in the Abkhazia War. She founded the Children's Music Theatre Studio in 1984, presenting musicals she had written herself. In 1988, she played the leading role in Nezhnost' (Tenderness) in Moscow's Operetta Theatre. In 2014, she appeared in her own special concert in Tbilisi, celebrating a career spanning 50 years.

Personal life 
She is married and has two daughters.

She gave birth to her first daughter in 1976 and her second in 1985.

She still lives in Tbilisi.

References

1958 births
Musicians from Tbilisi
20th-century women singers from Georgia (country)
21st-century women singers from Georgia (country)
Women television presenters from Georgia (country)
Soviet women singers
Composers from Georgia (country)
Soviet composers
Women poets from Georgia (country)
Women jazz singers
Women editors
Jazz singers from Georgia (country)
Soviet television presenters
People's Artists of Georgia
Soviet child singers
Living people
20th-century women composers